The men's coxed four competition at the 1936 Summer Olympics in Berlin took place are at Grünau on the Langer See. It was held from 12 to 14 August. There were 16 boats (80 competitors) from 16 nations, with each nation limited to a single boat in the event. The event was won by Germany, the second time the nation had won two consecutive gold medals in the men's coxed four (1900 and 1912 was the first; Switzerland also accomplished the feat in 1920 and 1924). Germany's four gold medals overall was the most any nation won in the event before it was discontinued; four nations (including two German teams, the United Team of Germany and East Germany) won two. Switzerland, which had won three straight medals in the 1920s before not competing in 1932, returned to the podium with a silver medal. Bronze went to France, the nation's first medal in the event since 1924. Both Italy (11th place) and Poland (9th place) had two-Games medal streaks broken.

Background

This was the seventh appearance of the event. Rowing had been on the programme in 1896 but was cancelled due to bad weather. The coxed four was one of the four initial events introduced in 1900. It was not held in 1904 or 1908, but was held at every Games from 1912 to 1992 when it (along with the men's coxed pair) was replaced with the men's lightweight double sculls and men's lightweight coxless four.

Six of the seven nations from the 1932 Games returned, with only New Zealand missing; returning nations included gold medallists Germany, silver medallists Italy, and bronze medallists Poland. Switzerland, a perennial contender that had missed the 1932 Games in Los Angeles, competed once again. The favourites were Germany and Switzerland, with Italy also a strong contender.

Uruguay and Yugoslavia each made their debut in the event. Belgium, France, Germany, and the United States each made their fifth appearance, tied for most among nations to that point.

Competition format

The coxed four event featured five-person boats, with four rowers and a coxswain. It was a sweep rowing event, with the rowers each having one oar (and thus each rowing on one side). The competition used the 2000 metres distance that became standard at the 1912 Olympics and which has been used ever since except at the 1948 Games.

Despite the field growing from 7 boats in 1932 to 16 in 1936, the tournament continued to use a three-round format: semifinals, repechage, final.

 There were three semifinal heats, with 5 or 6 boats each. The winner of each heat (3 boats) advanced directly to the final, while the remainder (13 boats) competed in the repechage.
 There were three repechage heats, with 4 or 5 boats each. The winner of each heat (3 boats) advanced to the final; others (10 boats) were eliminated.
 There was a single final, with 6 boats, to determine the medals and 4th–6th place.

Schedule

Results

Semifinals

The first boat of each heat qualified for the final, while the remainder went to the repechage.

Semifinal 1

Semifinal 2

Semifinal 3

Repechage

The first boat in each heat qualified for the final.

Repechage heat 1

Repechage heat 2

Repechage heat 3

Final

References

External links
 Official Olympic Report

Rowing at the 1936 Summer Olympics